Events in the year 2022 in Norway.

Incumbents
 Monarch – Harald V
 President of the Storting – Masud Gharahkhani (Labour).
 Prime Minister – Jonas Gahr Støre (Labour).

Events
1 February – Norway lifts almost all remaining COVID-19-related restrictions except for face mask rules due to the country's high vaccination rate.
25 February – Ukrainians, Norwegians, and Russians hold a joint anti-war protest in Kirkenes, Norway, calling for Vladimir Putin to be tried at the International Criminal Court at The Hague, Netherlands.
1 March – Norway joined Denmark, Sweden, and the United States were transition to the endemic phase.
7 March – One person dies and seven crew members are rescued after a fishing trawler capsizes in the North Sea while travelling to Norway, according to the Norwegian Coast Guard.
18 March – Four crew members are killed as a United States Marine Corps MV-22B Osprey aircraft crashes in Beiarn, Norway, while participating in the NATO military exercise Cold Response.
22 March – King Harald V tests positive for COVID-19.
20 May – Three people are wounded, one critically, in a stabbing attack in Uvdal and Nore, Norway. Police say that the attack was due to a domestic dispute between the perpetrator and his wife.
24 June – Kongsberg attack: A court in Norway finds the attacker not criminally responsible due to paranoid schizophrenia and sentences him to compulsory mental treatment.

25 June – 2022 Oslo shooting: Two people are killed and 21 others injured during mass shootings at three separate sites in central Oslo, Norway, including a gay nightclub. An Iranian-Norwegian man is arrested and charged with murder, attempted murder, and terrorism. The motive is suspected to be Islamic extremism.
27 September –
Norway raises its "emergency preparedness" in response to sightings of "unidentified drones" near its offshore oil and gas facilities in the North Sea, and is coordinating with its armed forces, police, and oil and gas industry operators, according to energy minister Terje Aasland.
Leaders from Poland, Norway and Denmark hold a ceremony to open the Baltic Pipe natural gas pipeline that will transport natural gas from the Norwegian shelf via Denmark to Poland.
31 October – 
Norwegian Prime Minister Jonas Gahr Støre announces that the country's military alert level will be increased tomorrow, in response to military drone sightings near offshore oil rigs in the past few weeks.
Two people are killed and another is injured by a helicopter crash in Verdal, Trøndelag.
12 December – A medieval ship is discovered at the bottom of Mjøsa.

Sports 
Norway at the 2022 Winter Olympics

Deaths

January
 
 

5 January – 
Arnljot Strømme Svendsen, economist, politician and writer (born 1921).
Sverre Bentzen, actor (born 1941).
9 January – Nils Henrik Måsø, politician (born 1952).
10 January – 
Nils A. Røhne, politician (born 1949).
Øystein Lønn, writer (born 1936).
11 January – Liv Lundberg, author (born 1944).
12 January – Jan Einar Greve, lawyer (born 1933).
17 January – Reidar Webster, civil servant (born 1935).
18 January – Arvid Nyberg, politician (born 1928).
19 January – Nils Arne Eggen, football manager (born 1941).
22 January – Sverre Stensheim, cross-country skier (born 1933).

February
5 February – Per Christian Hemmer, physicist (born 1933).
13 February – Berit Berthelsen, athlete (born 1944).
16 February – Erling Brandsnes, politician (born 1945).
20 February – Magnus Thue, politician (born 1980).
23 February – Per Voigt, ice hockey player (born 1951).
27 February – Ketil Børde, diplomat (born 1935).

March
 

3 March – Oddvar J. Majala, politician (born 1932).
5 March – Nils Dag Strømme, boxer (born 1945).
10 March – Magne Landrø, sport shooter (born 1937).
10 March – Borghild Hillestad, politician (born 1936).
14 March – Morten Schakenda, chef (born 1966).
17 March – Ingeborg Botnen, librarian and politician (born 1934).
18 March – 
Oddrun Hokland, athlete and organizational leader (born 1942).
Åge Sørensen, footballer (born 1937).
28 March – David Vikøren, shipping executive (born 1926).

April
 

3 April – Einar Østby, cross-country skier (born 1935).
10 April – Jon Herwig Carlsen, sports commentator (born 1937).
12 April – Arne Zwaig, chess player (born 1947).
14 April – Trygve Thue, guitarist and music producer (born 1950).
16 April – Sivert Langholm, historian (born 1927).
22 April – Synnøve Liaaen Jensen, chemist (born 1932).

May
 

1 May – Aage Müller-Nilssen, priest (born 1940).
2 May – Norvald Tveit, writer and playwright (born 1927).
5 May – Gunnar Sandborg, rower (born 1927).
16 May – Kjellaug Nakkim, politician (born 1940).
17 May – Johan Kleppe, veterinarian and politician (born 1928).
18 May – Alf Saltveit, writer (born 1946).
24 May – Thomas Ulsrud, curler (born 1971).

June

3 June – Kari Frisell, operatic soprano and pedagogue (born 1922).
5 June – 
Oddleif Olavsen, politician (born 1945).
Berit Stensønes, mathematician (born 1956).
16 June – Steinar Amundsen, sprint canoeist (born 1945).
22 June – Gerd Grønvold Saue, journalist and novelist (born 1930).

July
 

10 July – Bjørn Inge Mo, politician (born 1968).
14 July – Gunnar Mathisen, politician (born 1936).
15 July – Knut Korsæth, educator and politician (born 1932).
16 July – Egil Bakke, civil servant (born 1927).
25 July – Geir Børresen, actor and entertainer (born 1942).
26 July – Marit Paulsen, writer and politician (born 1939).

August

4 August – Thorleif Andresen, cyclist (born 1945).
8 August – Per Jansen, actor (born 1941).
14 August – Arne Legernes, footballer (born 1931).
16 August – Odd Reinsfelt, politician (born 1941).
19 August – Per Knutsen, writer and playwright (born 1951).
20 August – Audun Heimdal, orienteering and ski orienteering competitor (born 1997).
26 August – Espen Skjønberg, actor (born 1924).

September
 

3 September – Eva Børresen, ceramist (born 1920).
12 September – Britt Hildeng, politician (born 1943).
28 September – Torhild Bransdal, politician (born 1956).
29 September  
Egil Bjerklund, ice hockey player (born 1933).
Marit Christensen, journalist (born 1948).
30 September – Martin Stavrum, politician (born 1938).

October

 
 

2 October – Bjarne Mørk Eidem, politician and civil servant (born 1936).
3 October – Per Bredesen, footballer (born 1930).
6 October – Carl Fredrik Bunæs, sprinter (born 1939).
7 October – Torfinn Bjarkøy, civil servant (born 1952).
11 October – Frøydis Armand, actress (born 1949).
13 October – Halvor Næs, ski jumper (born 1928).
18 October – Ole Ellefsæter, cross country skier (born 1939).
22 October – Aksel Nærstad, politician (born 1952).
27 October – Fritz Huitfeldt, politician (born 1939). 
30 October  
Rosemarie Köhn, bishop (born 1939).
Reza Rezaee, politician (born 1960).

November
 

2 November – Jakob Eng, politician (born 1937).
4 November – Toralv Maurstad, actor (born 1926).
6 November – Tomm Kristiansen, journalist and writer (born 1950).
9 November – Mattis Hætta, singer (born 1959).
11 November – Per Flatberg, environmentalist (born 1937).
17 November – Annika Biørnstad, media executive (born 1957).
18 November – Per Arne Olsen, politician (born 1961).
29 November – Sigurd Frisvold, military officer (born 1947)

December 

 4 December – Gino Scarpa, Italian born Norwegian printer (born 1924)
 12 December – Erik Tønseth, industrialist (born `1946)
 22 December – Odd-Bjørn Fure, historian (born 1942)
29 December – Shabana Rehman Gaarder, comedian (born 1976 in Pakistan).

References

 
Norway
Norway
2020s in Norway
Years of the 21st century in Norway